Whately may refer to:

Places
 Whately, Massachusetts, a US town

People with the surname
 Helen Whately, English Conservative Party politician, Member of Parliament (MP) for Faversham and Mid Kent since 2015
 Kevin Whately (born 1951), British actor
 Richard Whately (1787–1863), British theologian, logician and political economist
 Thomas Whately (died 1772), British politician

See also
 Whatley (disambiguation)
 Whateley (disambiguation)
 Wheatley (disambiguation)